The 1962 LOT Vickers Viscount Warsaw crash occurred on 19 December 1962 when a Vickers Viscount 804, operated by LOT Polish Airlines on a flight from Brussels to Warsaw, crashed on landing. All passengers and crew died.

The plane was returning from Brussels, and had a mid-way landing in Berlin from where it took off at 5:55 pm. While on approach on runway 33 in Warsaw at 7:30 pm the crew received landing clearance. 46 seconds later the plane crashed and burned 1335 meters from the threshold.

All 33 people aboard died – the crew of 5 and 28 passengers. Among the victims was Heinz Rauch, head of the East German statistical service, along with his wife and two children

The Chief Committee of Aircraft Accident Investigation stated that at the time of the accident the plane was configured for landing (flaps set and landing gear lowered). It also stated there was no explosion mid-air and all damage was a result of the crash. The plane was landing in harsh, Winter weather conditions, with dense near-ground fog, 6/8 overcast, fractostratus clouds at 250 meters, 7-km visibility and temperature of 5 degrees below 0.

One of the probable causes of stalling due to low speed was attributed to turboprop engines features which change the propellers pitch during acceleration. Hence sudden throttle increase is not recommended. Such a maneuver was probably executed by the Captain who was accustomed to flying piston engine aircraft in which such maneuvers are allowed. The Vickers Viscount 804 was one of three recently bought from British United Airways in England.  On LOT's roster the airliner had logged only 84 flight hours.

Official accident causes:
 Crew error
 Crew training errors

There is a possibility that one of the NDB during approach was broken unbeknown to the crew.

References 

 Aviation Safety Network accident description
 ICAO Accident Digest No 14 Volume II Circular 71-AN/63, no.27 (str. 147/148) – report extract

Aviation accidents and incidents in Poland
Aviation accidents and incidents in 1962
1962 in Poland
LOT Polish Airlines accidents and incidents
December 1962 events in Europe
Accidents and incidents involving the Vickers Viscount
1962 disasters in Poland